Markus Dochantschi (born 1968, Neuburg, Germany) is a German-born architect based in New York. He is a registered architect in the United Kingdom and Germany, as well as a member of the American Institute of Architects.
As the founder and principal of studioMDA (Dochantschi Inc.), a New York–based, multidisciplinary design firm, Dochantschi has been recognized as one of the world's preeminent designers of art and cultural spaces. Dochantschi and his firm have designed more than thirty galleries, and over 200 international art booths and exhibitions, earning Dochantschi the title of "the Art World's New Go-To Architect” in 2017. The firm has also designed university buildings, auction houses, and private residences.

Education and early years 

Dochantschi was trained as an architect in Darmstadt, Germany and received his Masters of Architecture degree in 1995.
He was granted two scholarships including a DAAD scholarship which enabled him to work with Arata Isozaki and Tom Heneghan in Tokyo, Japan. Dochantschi was subsequently invited back to Tokyo by Fumihiko Maki in 1995.

Professional life

Following his time in Tokyo, Dochantschi joined London-based firm Zaha Hadid Architects. He continued to work closely with Zaha Hadid from 1995 until 2002, as a director, project director, project architect, and designer on projects including the Contemporary Arts Center in Cincinnati, Landesgartenschau Germany, Bergisel Ski Jump, and the Vista Master plan Singapore, among many others.

In 2002, Dochantschi established studioMDA in 2002 in New York. 
His work includes high-end and affordable residential, cultural, commercial, institutional, mixed-use, non-profit, and educational projects. 
He has designed spaces for New York–based galleries including Andrew Kreps Gallery, Bortolami Gallery, Anton Kern Gallery, Lisson Gallery, Carpenters Workshop Gallery, Richard Taittinger Gallery, Nahmad Contemporary, 303 Gallery, David Nolan Gallery, High Line Nine, and four galleries for Kasmin Gallery, as well as the Copenhagen-based new Faurschou Foundation in Brooklyn and Istanbul-based galleries Dirimart Gallery and Collectorspace. 
Dochantschi is known for his work on cultural institutions, showing a sensitivity to proportion, light, and, flexibility of space. In 2017, Artsy magazine featured him in the article, “These Architects Are Transforming the Way We Experience Art” listing studioMDA as one of the firms “behind some of the most inventive and influential cultural spaces today.” Dochantschi's style has been described as “airy,” “minimalist,” and “both modern and functional”.

Academia 

In 2003 Dochantschi taught an Advanced Studio at Yale University with Zaha Hadid, Stefan Behnisch, and Gerald Hines. 
Dochantschi served as the director of the Global Cities Architecture Program at Columbia GSAPP from 2013–2015 as well as Adjunct Professor for Planning and Preservation Advanced Studio from 2008–2017. 
Dochantschi has also been a Guest Lecturer at the Harvard Graduate School of Design and a guest critic at the Architectural Association School of Architecture, Columbia University, The Cooper Union, the University of Pennsylvania, Princeton University, the ETH Zurich, and the University of Applied Arts Vienna.

Selected projects

Cultural 
2022 Esther Schipper Gallery, Seoul, Korea
2022 Judith Whitney Godwin Foundation, New York
2022 Templon Gallery, New York
2022 Print Center New York, New York
2022 PPOW Gallery expansion, New York
2021 Harper's Gallery, New York
2021 George Adams Gallery, New York
2020 Luhring Augustine Gallery, New York
2020 PPOW Gallery, New York
2020 Phillips Headquarters, New York
2019 Andrew Kreps Gallery, New York, NY
2019 Faurschou Foundation, Brooklyn, NY
2018 High Line Nine, New York
2018 Kasmin Gallery (27th St), New York
2017 Anton Kern Gallery, New York
2017 Bortolami Gallery, NY
2016 Carpenters Workshop Gallery, New York
2016 Dirimart Gallery, Turkey
2016 Lisson Gallery, New York
2015 Paul Kasmin Gallery (297 10th Avenue), New York
2015 Richard Taittinger Gallery, New York
2014 Paul Kasmin Gallery Shop, New York
2014 Edward Tyler Nahem Fine Art, New York
2013 303 Gallery, New York
2013 Nahmad Contemporary, New York
2012 Collectorspace Istanbul Gallery, Turkey
2011 Paul Kasmin Gallery, New York
2008 David Nolan Gallery, New York

Residential 
2021 Waverly Avenue Residence, Brooklyn, New York
2021 Upper East Side Townhouse, New York
2020 Water's Edge Residence, New York
2020 Watertower Penthouse, New York
2020 Franklin St. Residences and Gallery, New York
2020 West Village Carriage House, New York
2018 East 78th Street Townhouse, New York
2018 Pool Pavilion, Bridgehampton, New York
2018 Southampton Residence, Long Island, New York
2018 Sagaponack Beach House II, Long Island, New York
2017 East 71st Street Townhouse, New York
2014 Sur Lago Residence, Tuxedo Park, New York
2014 UES Townhouse, New York
2014 Fort Greene Townhouse, Brooklyn, New York
2014 Fifth Avenue Penthouse, New York
2013 West Village Carriage House, New York
2013 137 Franklin Street, New York
2012 Detiger Loft, New York
2012 Sagaponack Barn, Sagaponack, New York
2009 Tuxedo Park Residence, New York
2009 Showtime House, New York
2008 Anchorage Residence, Alaska
2007 Stockholm Penthouse, Sweden
2007 740 Park Avenue, New York
2007 Noho Loft, New York, NY
2007 Greenwich Street Residence, New York
2007 Governor’s Road Residence, Bronxville
2007 Park Avenue Penthouse, New York,
2006 Maplewood Residence, New Jersey
2006 Chappaqua Residence, Chappaqua, New York
2006 Central Park West Residence, New York
2005 Chile Beach House, Chile
2005 Lima Beach House, Lima, Peru
2005 Bronxville Residence, Bronxville, New York

Institutional 
2022 Center for Advanced Mobility, Aachen, Germany

Commercial 
2022 Harper's Books, New York
2021 Phillips Headquarters offices, New York
2020 West 13 St. Lobby, New York
2020 Ping Pod, New York
2011 Exerblast, New York
2010 Gumulira Clinic, Malawi
2009 High Line Office, New York
2008 McIntosh Townhouse
2007 Audi Showroom, New York
2007 Tracy Anderson Dance Studio, New York
2005 WhatIF, New York.

Exhibitions 
2021 "Jean-Michel Basquiat", Nahmad Contemporary, New York
2021 "Picasso and the Process of Creation", Helly Nahmad Gallery, New York
2019 "Beverly Pepper Cor-Ten", Marlborough Contemporary, New York
2018 "TIME SPACE EXISTENCE", Palazzo Mora, Venice, Italy
2017 Les Lalanne, Paul Kasmin Gallery, New York
2016 Ed Ruscha's Ribbon Words, Edward Tyler Nahem Fine Art, New York
2016 Drawing Room, David Nolan Gallery, New York (curated and designed by studioMDA's founder, Markus Dochantschi)
2016 – 2017 IMPASSE RONSIN, Paul Kasmin Gallery, New York
2015 Max Ernst PARAMYTHS: SCULPTURE, 1934–1967, Paul Kasmin Gallery, New York
2015 Robert Motherwell, Works on paper 1951–1991, Paul Kasmin Gallery, New York 
2015 Mnemosyne, de Chirico and Antiquity, Helly Nahmad (New York art collector), New York
2014 Still Life, Nahmad Contemporary, New York
2014 Le Chant de La Grenouille The Surrealists in Conversation, Helly Nahmad (New York art collector), New York
2013 Brancusi in New York, Paul Kasmin Gallery, New York 
2011 National Arts Club Installation, New York
2011 Soutine-Bacon, Helly Nahmad (New York art collector), New York

Art Fairs 
Independent Art Fair Masterplan, New York (2022)

1-54 Contemporary African Art Fair Masterplan, New York

David Nolan Gallery, NY 
Art Basel (2005–2007, 2009–2019, 2022)
Art Basel Miami Beach (2005–2019, 2022) 
Frieze Art Fair, New York (2017)

Dirimart Gallery Istanbul
Art Basel Hong Kong (2016–2017)
Armory Show, NY (2017)
Art Basel (2018)
CI Istanbul (2016)

Helly Nahmad (New York art collector), NY
Art Basel (2010–2019, 2021-2022)
Art Basel Miami Beach (2007–2019, 2021-2022) 
FIAC /Foire Internationale d'Art Contemporain, Paris (2012,2016)
The European Fine Art Fair, NY (2011, 2017-2020, 2022)

Edward Tyler Nahem Fine Art
Abu Dhabi Art, Abu Dhabi (2011,2014)
Armory Show, NY (2011,2017)
Art Basel (2009–2019, 2021-2022)
Art Basel Hong Kong (2015,2016)
Art Basel Miami Beach (2010–2019, 2021-2022)
Frieze Art Fair, London (2012,2013)
The Seattle Art Fair, Seattle (2016) 
The European Fine Art Fair, NY (2017-2019, 2022)
FIAC /Foire Internationale d'Art Contemporain, Paris (2017)
ARCO, Madrid (2019, 2020)

Paul Kasmin Gallery, NY
Abu Dhabi Art, Abu Dhabi (2014) 
Armory Show, NY (2016-2018)
Art Basel (2012,2015–2021)
Art Basel Hong Kong (2014–2019)
Art Basel Miami Beach (2011,2013–2018,2021-2022)
American Art Dealer Association, NY (2015–2018) 
Art Stage Singapore, Singapore (2015)
EXPO Chicago, Chicago (2016, 2017) 
Frieze Art Fair, London (2011)
Frieze Art Fair, New York (2014–2016,2018,2019,2022)
The European Fine Art Fair, Maastricht (2014,2015) 
The European Fine Art Fair, NY (2014,2017,2018)
Zona Maco Arte Contemporaneo, Mexico (2015–2017)

Nahmad Contemporary, NY
FIAC /Foire Internationale d'Art Contemporain, Paris (2014-2019,2021)
Frieze Art Fair, London (2017,2019,2021)
Independent Art Fair (2022)
Paris+ Art Basel (2022)

Richard Taittinger, NY
Art Basel Miami Beach (2018)
Paris Photo (2018)
Armory Show, NY (2018,2019)
Art 1-54, New York (2019)

Malborough Gallery, NY
Art Basel (2019)
Art Basel Hong Kong (2018,2020)
Art Basel Miami Beach (2018)
Frieze Art Fair, London (2019)

Anton Kern, NY
Art Basel (2017-2022)
Art Basel Miami Beach (2017,2018,2020)
FIAC /Foire Internationale d'Art Contemporain, Paris (2018,2019)
Frieze Art Fair, New York (2018)

Van de Weghe, New York
The European Fine Art Fair, NY (2017)

Johyun Gallery, South Korea
Art Basel (2021)

Hammer Galleries, New York
Art Basel Miami Beach (2017)

Michael Rosenfeld Gallery, NY 
Art Basel Miami Beach (2011)

Fine Sound Group
Munich High End (2015)

Gary Nader Art Center, New York
Art Rio (2016)

Conceptual 
Phillips Headquarters, 2021, Hong Kong
Governors Island Climate Center, 2021, New York
FARROC, 2013, Queens, New York
Condominiums, 2013, Tanzania
Osnabrück Comprehensive School, 2011, Germany
ARC Competition, 2010, Colorado
Munich Olympics, 2010, Germany
Raising Malawi, 2009, Malawi
Tempelhof Competition, 2008, Berlin, Germany
Bam Tower, 2007, New York
Governors Island Biomass Park, 2006, New York City
Harbor Park Pavilion, 2005
Forsythe Dance Studio, 2004, Vermont
U2 Tower Competition, 2003, Dublin, Ireland

Other activities 
Dochantschi served on the Green Codes Committee in 2012, created to make recommendations for New York City Building Code revisions for greening the environment.

Kasmin Gallery's new flagship designed by studioMDA was recipient of the Architizer Annual A+ Awards for the Cultural – Gallery category in 2019.

References

External links

1968 births
Living people
20th-century German architects
21st-century German architects
German emigrants to the United States